The First Federal Electoral District of Nayarit (I Distrito Electoral Federal de Nayarit) is one of the 300 Electoral Districts into which Mexico is divided for the purpose of elections to the federal Chamber of Deputies and one of three such districts in the state of Nayarit.

It elects one deputy to the lower house of Congress for each three-year legislative period, by means of the first past the post system.

District territory
The First Federal Electoral District of Nayarit is in the north of the state and covers the municipalities of
Acaponeta, El Nayar, Huajicori, Rosamorada, Ruiz, Santiago Ixcuintla, Tecuala and Tuxpan.

The district's head town (cabecera distrital), where results from individual polling stations are gathered together and collated, is the city of  Santiago Ixcuintla.

Previous districting schemes

1996–2005 district
Between 1996 and 2005, Nayarit's First District covered the same territory as at present, with the exception of the municipality of
El Nayar, which belong to the Second District.

Deputies returned to Congress from this district 

L Legislature
 1976–1979:  Ignacio Langarica Quintana (PRI)
LI Legislature
 1979–1982:  Alberto Tapia Carrillo (PRI)
LII Legislature
 1982–1985:  Antonio Pérez Peña (PRI)
LIII Legislature
 1985–1988:  José Félix Torres Haro (PRI)
LIV Legislature
 1988–1991:  Salvador Sánchez Vázquez (PRI)
LV Legislature
 1991–1993:  Rigoberto Ochoa Zaragoza (PRI)
 1993–1994:  Juan Alonso Romero (PRI)
LVI Legislature
 1994–1997:  Fidel Pineda Valdez (PRI)
LVII Legislature
 1997–2000:  Marco Antonio Fernández (PRI)
LVIII Legislature
 2000–2003:  Álvaro Vallarta Ceceña (PRI)
LIX Legislature
 2003–2006:  María Hilaria Domínguez Arvizu (PRI)
LX Legislature
 2006–2009:  Sergio González García (PRI)
 LXI Legislature
 2009–2012:  Manuel Cota Jiménez (PRI)
 LXII Legislature
 2012–2015:  Juan Manuel Rocha Piedra (PRI)
 LXIII Legislature
 2015–2018:  Efraín Arellano Núñez (PRI)

References and notes 

Federal electoral districts of Mexico
Nayarit